Bourdet is a French surname. It may refer to:

Claude Bourdet (1909-1996), writer and politician
Edouard Bourdet (1887-1945), playwright.

It may also refer to:
Le Bourdet, a commune in the Deux-Sèvres department.